Chesumei is a constituency in Kenya. It is one of six constituencies in Nandi County.
The constituency was carved out from Emgwen and Mosop constituencies in 2013.  It borders Emgwen to the South and Mosop to the North.

References 

Constituencies in Nandi County